Huffy is the seventh studio album by American indie rock band We Are Scientists. It was released on October 8, 2021, by 100% Records.

Track listing

References

2021 albums
We Are Scientists albums